Three ships of the Royal Navy have borne the name HMS Trenchant:

 , a  launched in 1916 and scrapped in 1928.
 , a  launched in 1943 and scrapped in 1963.
 , a  launched in 1986, decommissioned in 2022

Royal Navy ship names